Mary Martin Ourisman (born February 27, 1946) is an American political consultant who served as U.S. Ambassador Extraordinary and Plenipotentiary to Barbados and the Eastern Caribbean, comprising the countries of Antigua and Barbuda, Dominica, Grenada, St. Kitts and Nevis, St. Lucia, and St. Vincent and the Grenadines. Mary was married to "Bubba" Johnson, and Steve Stiles previously.

Biography
Ourisman was born to Dr. Herbert and Aleen Martin in Texas, 1946. Her father was a dentist. She graduated from the University of Texas at Austin in 1970 with a Bachelor of Science degree. She also attended the Academy of Arts College in San Francisco and the New York School of Interior Design. She was married on July 9, 2019, to her fourth husband, Brig. Gen. Pete Dawkins. She is divorced from her first husband, Bubba, with whom she has one son, Colbert Johnson. Her second husband whom she also divorced was Steve Stiles. Third husband was Mandy Ourisman. 

From June 12, 1993 until his death on July 5, 2017, she was married to Mandell "Mandy" Ourisman, chairman of Ourisman Automotive Enterprises. She is a supporter of the arts, having organized fund raisers and served on numerous boards of directors for arts groups and museums. She was appointed to the Board of Trustees for the Kennedy Center by President Bush, and she sat on the board of trustees for the Washington National Opera. Ourisman was also on the board of directors for the Blair House, serving on the "decorating committee," for the President's guest house for visiting foreign Heads of State. She served on the Smithsonian National Board in 1999. She has also served on the World Wildlife Fund National Council, McCain 2000, the Elizabeth Dole Committee, and George W. Bush for President (2004). The Ourismans have donated $443,620 to GOP candidates and committees since 1999.

President George W. Bush announced his intention to name Ourisman the Ambassador to Barbados and the Eastern Caribbean on July 20, 2006, and submitted his formal nomination to the Senate the next day. The Senate confirmed Ourisman's nomination on September 13, 2006, she was appointed ambassador on October 11, and she arrived at the U.S. Embassy in Bridgetown, Barbados, on October 31.

She is currently involved with the Trust For the National Mall. She has homes in Florida and California.

References

|-

|-

|-

|-

|-

|-

1946 births
Ambassadors of the United States to Antigua and Barbuda
Ambassadors of the United States to Barbados
Ambassadors of the United States to Dominica
Ambassadors of the United States to Grenada
Ambassadors of the United States to Saint Kitts and Nevis
Ambassadors of the United States to Saint Lucia
Ambassadors of the United States to Saint Vincent and the Grenadines
American women ambassadors
Living people
Texas Republicans
University of Texas at Austin alumni
21st-century American diplomats
21st-century American women